Lewis Temple (22 October 1800 – 18 May 1854) was an American "negro whalecraft maker," blacksmith, abolitionist, and inventor. He was born in slavery in Richmond, Virginia, and moved to the whaling village of New Bedford, Massachusetts during the 1820s, where he worked as a blacksmith. He married Mary Clark in 1829 and they had three children. He is best remembered for the invention of "Temple's Toggle" or "Temple's Iron" which was a harpoon toggle tip based upon Eskimo and Indian harpoon tips brought back to New England by Whalers in 1835.  After some trials, whalers took to the improved harpoon as it prevented the whale from pulling free. Temple never patented his invention which resulted in others copying his work and selling it as their own. Temple did live well, enough to build a larger shop. Unfortunately, due to the negligence of a city construction worker, he fell and was injured. He sued the city and won two thousand dollars, which he never received. He died from his injuries in May 1854, aged 53. His profits from the invention went largely to paying off his debts.

See also 
 List of African-American inventors and scientists

References 
 Citations 

 Bibliography 
 Black History Month Daily Feature: Lewis Temple, Infozine.com website, February 22, 2006. 
 Gary L. Frost. "Lewis Temple." Article in Henry Louis Gates and Evelyn Brooks Higginbotham, eds. African American Lives (Oxford University Press, 2004), 803–804. .
 Kathryn Grover. The Fugitive's Gibraltar: Escaping Slaves and Abolitionism in New Bedford, Massachusetts (Amherst: University of Massachusetts Press, 2001). .
 Spence, Bill. "Harpooned, The Story of Whaling." 1980, Crescent Books. Library of Congress Catalog Card Number 79-91692
 Sidney Kaplan. "Lewis Temple and the Hunting of the Whale." The New England Quarterly 26 (March 1953): 78–88

External links
 New Bedford Whaling Museum::Lewis Temple & Harpoons

1800 births
1854 deaths
African-American abolitionists
19th-century American inventors
American blacksmiths
American people in whaling
19th-century American slaves
Abolitionists from New Bedford, Massachusetts
Accidental deaths from falls
Accidental deaths in Massachusetts
People from Richmond, Virginia